North Shore railway station is located on the Warrnambool line in Victoria, Australia. It serves the northern Geelong suburbs of North Shore and Norlane, and it opened on 15 April 1895. It was renamed Corio on 27 September 1909, and was renamed North Shore on 1 December 1913.

History

Although some references say the station opened on 15 April 1895, an 1857 map shows a station named Cowies Creek on the current site, which by the 1880s, was called North Shore. The level crossing at the station was protected by hand-operated gates for a number of years up until the mid-1890s, when the gatekeeper was withdrawn as an economy measure. The gatekeeper's cottage was retained as a residence for other railway employees.

In 1909, the station was briefly renamed Corio, reverting back to North Shore in 1913. In the 1920s, various other names, related to the industrial expansion in the area, were suggested for the station, including Jelbart, Pivot and Ford. In 1930, the Minister for Railways announced that the station's name would change to Pivot, but the name changed never proceeded.

In 1939, flashing light signals were provided at the Station Street level crossing, located nearby in the Down direction of the station, with boom barriers provided later on in 1984.

In the early 1950s, the station was reduced to being staffed by a caretaker, responsible to the stationmaster at Corio. In February 1959, the former single line was duplicated from North Geelong to Corio, and North Shore was re-built as an island platform, 200 metres to the north of the old station. The previous group of standard country railway buildings was replaced by a small wooden office and waiting room. After being damaged by fire in 1990, the building was replaced by two metal bus shelters.

In 1995, the Western standard gauge line was built to the west of the station, and is primarily used by freight trains to and from Adelaide. In May 1999, a short platform was provided for The Overland passenger service.

A kilometre south of North Shore, the North Geelong Loop, first opened in 1903, connects the Melbourne – Geelong and Geelong – Ballarat lines.

Platforms and services

North Shore has one island platform with two faces and one side platform. It is serviced by V/Line Geelong line and selected Warrnambool line services on broad gauge, and Journey Beyond The Overland services on standard gauge.

Platform 1:
 services to Southern Cross
 weekend services to Southern Cross

Platform 2:
 services to Geelong, South Geelong and Waurn Ponds
 two weekend services to Warrnambool

Platform 3:
 Journey Beyond services to Adelaide Parklands (pick up only) and Melbourne (Southern Cross) (set down only) (two services per week)

Transport links

CDC Geelong operates three routes via North Shore station, under contract to Public Transport Victoria:
: to Deakin University Waurn Ponds Campus
: to Geelong station
: Corio Shopping Centre – North Shore

Gallery

References

External links
Victorian Railway Stations gallery

Railway stations in Geelong
Railway stations in Australia opened in 1895
Regional railway stations in Victoria (Australia)